Kätlin is an Estonian feminine given name. It's a variant of Katherine.

Notable people who share the given name Kätlin include:
Kätlin Aas (born 1992), Estonian fashion model
Kätlin Kaldmaa (born 1970), Estonian freelance writer, poet, translator and literary critic
Kätlin Piirimäe (born 1995), Estonian shot putter and discus thrower
Kätlin Sepp (born 1992), Estonian swimmer
Kätlin Valdmets (born 1988), Estonian beauty queen
Kätlin Vainola (born 1978), Estonian children’s author and poet

Estonian feminine given names